Primeval is a Big Finish Productions audio drama based on the long-running British science fiction television series Doctor Who.

Plot
When Nyssa's psychic abilities threaten her life, the Doctor takes her to ancient Traken.  Will Nyssa be healed, or does the Doctor's arrival threaten Traken and its Source?

Cast
The Doctor — Peter Davison
Nyssa — Sarah Sutton
Shayla — Susan Penhaligon
Sabian — Ian Hallard
Kwundaar — Stephen Greif
Janneus — Rita Davies
Hyrca — Mark Woolgar
Etrayk — Alistair Lock
Anona — Romy Tennant
Narthex — Billy Miller

Notes
References are made to several events from other stories that take place shortly before this one in story chronology, including Nyssa learning the Charleston in Black Orchid, the Doctor losing his sonic screwdriver in The Visitation, the death of Adric in Earthshock and Tegan coping with visiting her own planet's past in such stories as The Visitation and Time-Flight.
Nyssa's display of latent psychic abilities in Time-Flight and the audio play Winter for the Adept is explained as a plot point, along with Nyssa's sudden collapse (ostensibly from exhaustion) at the end of Four to Doomsday, which necessitated her spending most of Kinda asleep in the TARDIS.
Much of the story is based on the setting of the world of Traken as laid out in the serial The Keeper of Traken.  Many of the same settings are re-used: the Consuls' chamber, the Source chamber, and the Grove.

External links
Big Finish Productions – Primeval

Fifth Doctor audio plays
2001 audio plays